The Mini-Fly Set is a German powered hang glider that was designed and produced by Mini-Fly GmbH of Kirchardt. Now out of production, when it was available the aircraft was supplied complete and ready-to-fly.

Design and development
The aircraft features a cable-braced hang glider-style high-wing, weight-shift controls, single-place accommodation, foot-launching and landing and a single engine in pusher configuration.

The aircraft uses a standard hang glider wing, made from bolted-together aluminum tubing, with its double surface wing covered in Dacron sailcloth. The wing is supported by a single tube-type kingpost and uses an "A" frame control bar. The engine is a two-stroke, single cylinder Sachs 166 industrial engine of  driving a 3.4:1 reduction drive. The engine is mounted at the front of, and below the wing on a separate tube running parallel to the wing's keel tube. The  fuel tank is mounted above and behind the engine. The two-bladed, wooden, fixed pitch propeller with a  diameter is located at the rear of the wing's keel tube and is protected from ground contact by a tail wheel mounted on a long aluminum tube. The propeller is driven by a long extension shaft.

The pilot may take off in the prone position or from a standing start as in a conventional hang glider hill launch.

Specifications

References

Set
1990s German ultralight aircraft
Single-engined pusher aircraft
Powered hang gliders